"Big Game Hunt" is a science fiction short story by the British writer Arthur C. Clarke, first published in 1956. This story describes the efforts of an eccentric professor to study the electrical circuitry of the brain. After using his research to develop robotic creatures, he then tries to use electrical stimulation of the brain to control the behavior of animals. The professor's work is discovered by a wildlife photographer, who tries to exploit it to film a giant squid. While their attempt is initially successful, the equipment blows a fuse, and the squid kills both scientist and photographer. The story was also published as "The Reckless Ones".

The piece was later published as the second story in Clarke's collection Tales from the White Hart. The story is the only one in the collection not narrated by Harry Purvis.

References

External links 
 

Short stories by Arthur C. Clarke
1950 short stories
Tales from the White Hart